Paulo Marcelo Souza Alves (born 20 July 1995) is a Brazilian professional footballer player who plays for Portuguese club Amora.

Career statistics

References

External links

1995 births
People from Guaratinguetá
Footballers from São Paulo (state)
Living people
Brazilian footballers
Association football forwards
São Bernardo Futebol Clube players
Sampaio Corrêa Futebol Clube players
IFK Värnamo players
GAIS players
Utsiktens BK players
Amora F.C. players
Campeonato Brasileiro Série B players
Campeonato Brasileiro Série D players
Superettan players
Ettan Fotboll players
Brazilian expatriate footballers
Brazilian expatriate sportspeople in Sweden
Expatriate footballers in Sweden
Brazilian expatriate sportspeople in Portugal
Expatriate footballers in Portugal